Sir Harold Edwin Boulton, 2nd Baronet,  (7 August 1859 – 1 June 1935), son of Sir Samuel Bagster Boulton, 1st Baronet of Copped Hall, born in Charlton then part of Kent, was an English baronet, songwriter and philanthropist, most famously author of the lyrics to the "Skye Boat Song". He first became interested in Scottish folk songs as an undergraduate at Oxford.

A portrait by Bassano is in the National Portrait Gallery collection.

He married, first, Adelaide Lucy Davidson, daughter of Duncan Davidson of Tulloch Castle, and had three children, Louise Kythé Veronica Boulton (18 September 1890 – 21 May 1934), Christian Harold Ernest Boulton (17 February 1897 – 12 October 1917)  and Denis Duncan Harold Owen Boulton, 3rd Baronet Boulton, known as "Harold" (10 December 1892 – 10 August 1968), who was a survivor of the 1915 sinking of the RMS Lusitania.

After his first wife's death on 26 April 1926, he was married again, to Margaret Cunningham Lyons, daughter of James Lennox Lyons, on 29 December 1926.

References

External links
‘BOULTON, Sir Harold (Edwin)’, Who Was Who, A & C Black, an imprint of Bloomsbury Publishing plc, 1920–2008; online edn, Oxford University Press, Dec 2007 accessed 7 March 2013
Anne Pimlott Baker, ‘Boulton, Sir Harold Edwin, second baronet (1859–1935)’, Oxford Dictionary of National Biography, Oxford University Press, 2004, accessed 7 March 2013

1859 births
1935 deaths
British songwriters
Commanders of the Order of the British Empire
Commanders of the Royal Victorian Order
Harold
English justices of the peace
Baronets in the Baronetage of the United Kingdom